Brendon LaBatte (born September 12, 1986) is a Canadian football guard with the Saskatchewan Roughriders of the Canadian Football League. He was drafted sixth overall by the Winnipeg Blue Bombers in the 2008 CFL Draft. He played CIS Football with the Regina Rams.

Career
LaBatte was drafted by the Winnipeg Blue Bombers with the sixth overall pick in the 2008 CFL Draft. He went on to win three consecutive CFL East Division All-Star awards from 2009 to 2011. Prior to the 2011 East Division final, Labatte was named to his first ever CFL All-Star team.

LaBatte won the 2013 Grey Cup with Saskatchewan on November 24, 2013. He signed a contract extension with the Roughriders through the 2022 season on December 23, 2020. He opted out of the 2021 CFL season for personal reasons before the start of the season, and the team placed him on their suspended list on July 3.

References

External links
Saskatchewan Roughriders bio 
Winnipeg Blue Bombers bio

1986 births
Living people
Canadian football offensive linemen
Players of Canadian football from Saskatchewan
Regina Rams players
Saskatchewan Roughriders players
Sportspeople from Weyburn
Winnipeg Blue Bombers players